Andreas Bammer (born 18 July 1984) is an Austrian footballer who plays for USK Anif in the Austrian Regionalliga West.

References

External links

 Andreas Bammer Interview

Austrian footballers
Austrian Football Bundesliga players
SV Ried players
SC Rheindorf Altach players
FC Wacker Innsbruck (2002) players
FC Liefering players
1984 births
Living people
People from Bad Ischl
Association football forwards
Footballers from Upper Austria